Guy St. Clair (born 1940) is an American educator, author, and knowledge services specialist. He is a graduate of the University of Virginia and the University of Illinois.

Guy St. Clair is the Series Editor for Knowledge Services, the series from Verlag Walter de Gruyter, the scholarly publishing house specializing in academic literature. He also teaches in the Postbaccalaureate Studies Program at the School of Professional Studies, Columbia University in the City of New York.

References

External links
 SMR International
 M.S. in Information and Knowledge Strategy program at Columbia University

American librarians
University of Virginia alumni
University of Illinois alumni
Living people
1940 births